Accountability in Research is a peer-reviewed academic journal, published by Taylor & Francis, examining systems for ensuring integrity in the conduct of biomedical research. The editor-in-chief is Adil E. Shamoo (University of Maryland School of Medicine).

In 2020 was Impact Factor 2.622.

References

Bioethics journals
Publications established in 1989
Accountability
Taylor & Francis academic journals
Bimonthly journals